Stokkeland is a Norwegian surname. Notable people with the surname include:

Espen Stokkeland (born 1968), Norwegian sailor
Kai Ove Stokkeland (born 1978), Norwegian footballer and manager
Kåre Stokkeland (1918–1985), Norwegian politician

Norwegian-language surnames